Anelli  (also known as anelletti) are small, thin rings of pasta. They are generally used for soups and pasta salads. A smaller version of anelli is anellini, which is about one-quarter of the size. Anelli pasta is used in the production of Campbell's Franco-American SpaghettiOs.

See also
Italian cuisine
Spaghetti

Cuisine of Sicily
Types of pasta